The arrondissement of Perpignan is an arrondissement of France in the Pyrénées-Orientales department (Northern Catalonia) in the Occitanie region. It has 39 communes.

Composition

The communes of the arrondissement of Perpignan, and their INSEE codes, are:

 Baho (66012)
 Baixas (66014)
 Le Barcarès (66017)
 Bompas (66021)
 Cabestany (66028)
 Calce (66030)
 Canet-en-Roussillon (66037)
 Canohès (66038)
 Cases-de-Pène (66041)
 Cassagnes (66042)
 Claira (66050)
 Espira-de-l'Agly (66069)
 Estagel (66071)
 Llupia (66101)
 Montner (66118)
 Opoul-Périllos (66127)
 Perpignan (66136)
 Peyrestortes (66138)
 Pézilla-la-Rivière (66140)
 Pia (66141)
 Pollestres (66144)
 Ponteilla (66145)
 Rivesaltes (66164)
 Sainte-Marie-la-Mer (66182)
 Saint-Estève (66172)
 Saint-Féliu-d'Avall (66174)
 Saint-Hippolyte (66176)
 Saint-Laurent-de-la-Salanque (66180)
 Saint-Nazaire (66186)
 Saleilles (66189)
 Salses-le-Château (66190)
 Le Soler (66195)
 Tautavel (66205)
 Torreilles (66212)
 Toulouges (66213)
 Villelongue-de-la-Salanque (66224)
 Villeneuve-de-la-Raho (66227)
 Villeneuve-la-Rivière (66228)
 Vingrau (66231)

History

The arrondissement of Perpignan was created in 1800. In January 2017 it lost 24 communes to the arrondissement of Céret and 23 communes to the arrondissement of Prades.

As a result of the reorganisation of the cantons of France which came into effect in 2015, the borders of the cantons are no longer related to the borders of the arrondissements. The cantons of the arrondissement of Perpignan were, as of January 2015:

 Canet-en-Roussillon
 La Côte Radieuse
 Elne
 Latour-de-France
 Millas
 Perpignan-1
 Perpignan-2
 Perpignan-3
 Perpignan-4
 Perpignan-5
 Perpignan-6
 Perpignan-7
 Perpignan-8
 Perpignan-9
 Rivesaltes
 Saint-Estève
 Saint-Laurent-de-la-Salanque
 Saint-Paul-de-Fenouillet
 Thuir
 Toulouges

References

Perpignan
Perpignan